Qolhak-e Olya (also Romanized as Qolhak-e ‘Olyā; also known as Qolhak-e Bālā) is a village in Qushkhaneh-ye Bala Rural District, Qushkhaneh District, Shirvan County, North Khorasan Province, Iran. At the 2006 census, its population was 358, in 82 families.

References 

Populated places in Shirvan County